The 1956–57 Liga Bet season saw Hapoel Balfouria and Shimshon Tel Aviv promoted to Liga Alef as the respective winners of the north and south divisions. They were joined by Maccabi Hadera and Bnei Yehuda, who finished second in each of their respective divisions.

North Division

Ahva Notzrit Haifa collapsed and withdrew from the league.

South Division

References
1956-57 Bnei Yehuda 
Spiegel safely brought Maccabi back to Liga Alef Heruth, 16.7.57, Historical Jewish Press 

Liga Bet seasons
Israel
3